The 2020 NLEX Road Warriors season was the sixth season of the franchise in the Philippine Basketball Association (PBA).

Key dates
December 8, 2019: The 2019 PBA draft took place in Midtown Atrium, Robinson Place Manila.
March 11, 2020: The PBA postponed the season due to the threat of the coronavirus.

Draft

Special draft

Regular draft

Roster

Philippine Cup

Eliminations

Standings

Game log

|-bgcolor=ffcccc
| 1
| October 11
| Ginebra
| L 92–102
| J. R. Quiñahan (26)
| Soyud, Alas (8)
| Kevin Alas (5)
| AUF Sports Arena & Cultural Center
| 0–1
|-bgcolor=ffcccc
| 2
| October 14
| Magnolia
| L 100–103
| Kiefer Ravena (27)
| Raul Soyud (12)
| Kevin Alas (5)
| AUF Sports Arena & Cultural Center
| 0–2
|-bgcolor=ffcccc
| 3
| October 17
| Blackwater
| L 88–98
| Mike Ayonayon (20)
| Kiefer Ravena (8)
| Kiefer Ravena (7)
| AUF Sports Arena & Cultural Center
| 0–3
|-bgcolor=ccffcc
| 4
| October 21
| NorthPort
| W 102–88
| Kiefer Ravena (25)
| Soyud, Alas (10)
| Kevin Alas (6)
| AUF Sports Arena & Cultural Center
| 1–3
|-bgcolor=ffcccc
| 5
| October 23
| Meralco
| L 92–101
| Kiefer Ravena (30)
| J. R. Quiñahan (11)
| Kevin Alas (5)
| AUF Sports Arena & Cultural Center
| 1–4
|-bgcolor=ffcccc
| 6
| October 26
| Phoenix
| L 110–114
| Raul Soyud (27)
| Quiñahan, Ravena (5)
| Kiefer Ravena (10)
| AUF Sports Arena & Cultural Center
| 1–5
|-bgcolor=ccffcc
| 7
| October 29
| TNT
| W 109–98
| Kevin Alas (24)
| J. R. Quiñahan (10)
| J. R. Quiñahan (7)
| AUF Sports Arena & Cultural Center
| 2–5

|-bgcolor=ccffcc
| 8
| November 4
| Rain or Shine
| W 94–74
| Kevin Alas (18)
| Raul Soyud (9)
| Mike Ayonayon (7)
| AUF Sports Arena & Cultural Center
| 3–5
|-bgcolor=ccffcc
| 9
| November 6
| San Miguel
| W 124–90
| Michael Miranda (22)
| Kevin Alas (9)
| Ravena, Cruz (7)
| AUF Sports Arena & Cultural Center
| 4–5
|-bgcolor=ffcccc
| 10
| November 9
| Alaska
| L 119–122 OT
| Kiefer Ravena (30)
| Raul Soyud (10)
| Ravena, Alas (7)
| AUF Sports Arena & Cultural Center
| 4–6
|-bgcolor=ccffcc
| 11
| November 11
| Terrafirma
| W 127–101
| Kiefer Ravena (23)
| Michael Miranda (8)
| Jericho Cruz (6)
| AUF Sports Arena & Cultural Center
| 5–6

References

NLEX Road Warriors seasons
NLEX Road Warriors